The 1877 Cincinnati Reds season was the team's second season in the National League. The team finished sixth and last in the league with a record of 15–42, 25½ games behind the first place Boston Red Caps.

Regular season

After finishing dead last in the National League in the 1876 season, the Reds attempted to improve their club by signing Lip Pike, who spent the previous season with the St. Louis Brown Stockings. Pike was also named the manager of the team. Some other off-season additions included Bob Addy, who spent the previous season with the Chicago White Stockings, Jack Manning of the Boston Red Caps, and a couple of new pitchers: Candy Cummings, who had a 16–8 record with a 1.67 ERA with the Hartford Dark Blues, and Bobby Mathews, who had a 21–34 record with New York Mutuals in 1876.

The Reds got off to another terrible start, as they had a 3–11 start to the season, and Pike stepped down as the manager. The team was briefly disbanded by owner Josiah Keck, and although a group of eight businessmen stepped in to rescue the franchise, some Cincinnati players had been signed by other teams in the interim, and some newspapers subsequently refused to list the Red's results. Bob Addy took over as player manager; however, he too saw very few wins as Cincinnati went 5–19 during his managerial stint. Jack Manning then finished the year as player-manager, going 7–12, as the Reds had a 15–42 record and once again finished in the National League cellar, 25.5 games behind the first place Boston Red Caps.

Charley Jones had another solid season for the Reds, hitting .310 with two homers and a team high 36 RBI. Manning also had a solid year, hitting .317, as he had a team high 80 hits while tying Jones with a team high 36 RBI. Pike hit .298 with a team high four home runs, and added 23 RBI. On the mound, rookie Bobby Mitchell came up late in the season and was very impressive, leading Cincinnati with six victories and a team best 3.51 ERA in twelve games.

Season standings

Record vs. opponents

Roster

Player stats

Batting

Starters by position
Note: Pos = Position; G = Games played; AB = At bats; H = Hits; Avg. = Batting average; HR = Home runs; RBI = Runs batted in

Other batters
Note: G = Games played; AB = At bats; H = Hits; Avg. = Batting average; HR = Home runs; RBI = Runs batted in

Pitching

Starting pitchers
Note: G = Games pitched; IP = Innings pitched; W = Wins; L = Losses; ERA = Earned run average; SO = Strikeouts

Other pitchers
Note: G = Games pitched; IP = Innings pitched; W = Wins; L = Losses; ERA = Earned run average; SO = Strikeouts

References

Cincinnati Reds (1876–1880) seasons
Cincinnati Reds season
Cincinnati